Irek Envarovich Faizullin (born 8 December 1962) is a Russian statesman and politician who is currently the Minister for Construction and Housing since 10 November 2020. He was deputy minister for construction and housing from 22 January 2020 until 9 November 2020, when Prime Minister of Russia Mikhail Mishustin nominated Faizullin for the post of Minister of Construction & Housing. He was approved by the State Duma and confirmed the post on 10 November.

He is also a member of the board of directors of Russian Railways.

Notes

References

United Russia politicians
1962 births
Living people
Russian individuals subject to European Union sanctions